Pete Johnson may refer to:
Pete Johnson (musician) (1904–1967), American jazz pianist
Pete Johnson (rock critic), Los Angeles Times music writer
Pete Johnson (Mississippi politician) (born 1948), State Auditor of Mississippi from 1988 to 1992
Pete Johnson (American football) (born 1954), American football running back
Pete Johnson (author) (born 1965), British children's author

See also
Peter Johnson (disambiguation)